Smillie is a surname and may refer to:

 Andy Smillie (born 1941), English (soccer) footballer
 Carol Smillie (born 1961), Scottish television presenter, remembered as Wheel of Fortune co-host
 Don Smillie (1910–1993), Canadian ice hockey player
 George Henry Smillie (1840–1921), American landscape painter
 Grant Smillie (born 1977), Australian music DJ, based in Melbourne
 James Smillie, British and Australian actor, as Dr. Dan Marshall in the Australian soap opera Return to Eden
 James David Smillie (1833–1909), American painter and engraver
 Jennie Smillie Robertson (1878–1981), Canada's first female surgeon
 John Smillie (soccer) (born 1954), retired Scottish-American soccer player
 John Smillie (mathematician) (born 1953), American mathematician
 Neil Smillie (born 1958), English (soccer) football player and manager
 Raymond Smillie (1904–1993), Canadian boxer who competed in the 1928 Olympics
 Robert Smillie (1857–1940), British trade unionist and Labour Party politician
Ron Smillie (1933–2005), English footballer 
Ryan Smillie (born 1992), Scottish  footballer 
Thomas Smillie (1843 –1917), Scottish-American photographer and archivist with the Smithsonian Institution
Tuesday Smillie (born 1981),  American interdisciplinary artist 
 William Smillie (1810–1852), South Australian advocate-general and politician

See also
 Smellie, a surname
Smiley (disambiguation)

Surnames